Candan is a Turkish name. Notable people with the name include:

 Berkay Candan (born 1993), Turkish basketball player
 Candan Erçetin (born 1963), Turkish female singer, songwriter
 Fatih Candan (born 1989), Turkish-German footballer

Turkish unisex given names
Turkish-language surnames